Natasha Wightman (born 1971) is an English  actress who appeared in British and American films and British television productions from 1999 until 2005. Productions in which she has co-starred include Gosford Park (2001), Revelation (2001), Mouth to Mouth (2005), and V for Vendetta (2006). She also appeared in several episodes of the British TV serial State of Play.

Career
In 1999, Wightman starred in the British films The Feather Room and Romeo Thinks Again, with the latter production featuring Wightman as Juliet. In 2001, Wightman co-starred in the mystery film Gosford Park directed by Robert Altman. She portrayed Lady Lavinia, the sister of Kristin Scott Thomas's character and the wife of Lt. Commander Anthony Meredith (played by Tom Hollander). That year, Wightman also appeared in Revelation alongside James D'Arcy and Terence Stamp. Directed and written by Stuart Urban, the British adventure film features a team searching for an ancient relic once possessed by the Knights Templar. Wightman plays Mira, an alchemist. 

In 2003, Wightman acted in several episodes of the British TV serial State of Play. The 2005 British film Mouth to Mouth, directed by Alison Murray, includes Wightman as Rose, the incompetent mother of the protagonist Sherry (played by Elliot Page). 

The following year, Wightman appeared in the dystopian political thriller V for Vendetta as Valerie Page. Her character a lesbian who is imprisoned by the totalitarian regime due to her sexual orientation. The actress stated that during Valerie's incarceration, "She finds something, her integrity, which they can't take from her. She'd almost died and then come alive again through what she found in herself." Wightman shaved her head for the role, and felt this decision helped display prejudice faced by many lesbians. During this period, Wightman's neighbour called the police after assuming the actress was a man trying to break into her house. Slant Magazine praised Wightman's performance and voiceover work in the film, believing she "greatly helped" turn the prison scenes "into something poetic".

Personal life
Wightman is married to film-maker George Duffield.

Work
Film and television
V for Vendetta (2006) .... Valerie
The Rope (2005) .... Woman tied to man
Mouth to Mouth (2005) .... Rose
The Trouble with Love (2003) .... Rosamond Lehmann
State of Play (2003) (TV) .... Sheena Gough (2 episodes)
Shoreditch (2003) .... Masie Hickman
Skydance, rendezvous à Paris (2002) .... Carole
Mexicano (2002) .... Katherine
Pas de Trois (2002) .... Sophie
Gosford Park (2001) .... Lady Lavinia Meredith
Revelation (2001) .... Mira
Murder on the Orient Express (2001) (TV) .... Mary Debenham
Romeo Thinks Again (1999) .... Juliet
The Feather Room (1999).... Nina

Stage
As You Like It (Soho Theatre Group) .... Rosalind
Blithe Spirit (Tristan Bates Theatre) .... Ruth
La Ronde (Southwark Playhouse) .... Young Miss
Richard III (Rose Theatre) .... Lady Anne

References

Works cited

External links

English film actresses
English stage actresses
English television actresses
Living people
British Shakespearean actresses
People educated at the Elmhurst School for Dance
1973 births